Bedmonton or Bedmanton is a hamlet situated about five miles (8 km) on a minor road between the B2163 road and Wormshill  to the south of Sittingbourne in Kent, England.

Villages in Kent